Double Mountain Brewery & Taproom is a brewery and pub based in Hood River, Oregon, United States.  The company was founded in 2007.

Double Mountain's beers are distributed in the Pacific Northwest, the Los Angeles area, and New Jersey.

Portland expansion 

In 2016, Double Mountain opened a second pub in the Woodstock neighborhood of southeast Portland, Oregon, marking the company's first expansion outside Hood River. Prior to opening, Double Mountain made exterior and interior improvements to the building, which included a kitchen remodel and dining area expansion. The satellite location does not have an on-site brewery. Unlike the Hood River pub, the Woodstock restaurant has a full liquor license.

Reception
Willamette Week included the Hood River location in its 2015 "beer guide", "Hood River Beer Escape".

Double Mountain's "Double Mountain IRA" beer won the "best red, brown or amber beer" award in The Oregonian 2015 People's Choice voting. The newspaper's staff also voted the IRA beer one of Oregon's top 10 craft beers.

See also
 List of restaurants in Portland, Oregon

References

External links

 
 
 
 

2007 establishments in Oregon
2016 establishments in Oregon
American companies established in 2007
Beer brewing companies based in Oregon
Food and drink companies established in 2007
Companies based in Hood River, Oregon
Restaurants established in 2007
Restaurants established in 2016
Restaurants in Portland, Oregon
Woodstock, Portland, Oregon